Macrobrachium faustinum is a species of freshwater shrimp that was first described in 1857. M. faustinum is dark brown and found from Florida to the Caribbean and southwards to Venezuela.

References

Palaemonidae
Freshwater crustaceans of South America
Crustaceans described in 1857